Keith Patrick Tomlins (born 23 October 1957 in Kingston-upon-Thames, Surrey) is a former cricketer. After education at St Benedict's School he made his debut for Middlesex as a right-handed middle order batsman in 1977, but, despite a decade on the staff, did not establish his place in a powerful side.  He moved to Gloucestershire in 1986 search of regular first team cricket and later played minor county cricket for Wiltshire.  In 108 first-class matches he scored 3880 runs at an average of 27 with 5 centuries and a best of 146.

After retiring from playing he moved into coaching for the ECB.

References
Cricinfo

1957 births
People educated at St Benedict's School, Ealing
English cricketers
Gloucestershire cricketers
Middlesex cricketers
Wiltshire cricketers
Living people
People from Kingston upon Thames